In enzymology, a luteolin-7-O-diglucuronide 4'-O-glucuronosyltransferase is an enzyme that catalyzes the chemical reaction

UDP-glucuronate + luteolin 7-O-beta-D-diglucuronide  UDP + luteolin 7-O-[beta-D-glucuronosyl-(1->2)-beta-D-glucuronide]-4'-O-beta-D- glucuronide

Thus, the two substrates of this enzyme are UDP-glucuronate and luteolin 7-O-beta-D-diglucuronide, whereas its 4 products are UDP, luteolin, [[7-O-[beta-D-glucuronosyl-(1->2)-beta-D-glucuronide]-4'-O-beta-D-]], and glucuronide.

This enzyme belongs to the family of glycosyltransferases, specifically the hexosyltransferases.  The systematic name of this enzyme class is UDP-glucuronate:luteolin-7-O-beta-D-diglucuronide 4'-O-glucuronosyltransferase. Other names in common use include uridine diphosphoglucuronate-luteolin 7-O-diglucuronide, glucuronosyltransferase, UDP-glucuronate:luteolin 7-O-diglucuronide-glucuronosyltransferase, UDPglucuronate:luteolin, 7-O-diglucuronide-4'-O-glucuronosyl-transferase, and LDT.

References

 

EC 2.4.1
Enzymes of unknown structure